The National Polytechnic Institutes (Instituts Nationaux Polytechniques or INPs) in France are five consortiums of grandes écoles that offer engineering degrees.

Description
They were established in 1969. They are classed together with French universities by Article 24 of the law regarding the organization of higher education in France (law 84-52 of 26 January 1984, the loi Savary). 

However, they are quite different from the public universities, both in their organization and in the fact that they have competitive admissions.

Institutions
The five institutions in the National Polytechnic Institutes are:

 The Grenoble Institute of Technology (Institut National Polytechnique de Grenoble or INP Grenoble)
 The National Polytechnic Institute of Toulouse (Institut National Polytechnique de Toulouse or Toulouse INP)
 The National Polytechnic Institute of Lorraine (Institut National Polytechnique de Lorraine or Lorraine INP)
 The Polytechnic Institute of Bordeaux (Institut Polytechnique de Bordeaux or Bordeaux INP)
 The Polytechnic Institute of Clermont-Auvergne (Institut national polytechnique Clermont-Auvergne or Clermont Auvergne INP)

.
.
University associations and consortia in France
Grandes écoles